The Muslim conquest of Azerbaijan was the military struggle that led to Azerbaijan's incorporation in the Islamic caliphate. In AD 643 (AH 22), after the conquest of Rayy and Central Persia, Umar ordered the conquest of Azarbaijan. The Rashidun Caliphate continued the conquest toward Azerbaijan first under the force of Al Mughirah bin Shubah. This was reported by Abu Jafar (Tabari), quoting the report from Ahmad bin Thabit al Razi.

History
Umar appointed Hudheifa to the command of the campaign. Hudheifa first marched to Zanjan. The local garrison defended itself but was eventually overpowered and the city fell. 

The Muslim forces proceeded to Ardabil where the Persians did not resist and surrendered on the usual terms of Jizya (the annual tax levied on non-Muslims). From Ardabeel, the Muslim forces marched northward along the western coast of the Caspian Sea. A confrontation ensued at the Bab area which was an important port on the Caspian Sea. The Muslims scored another victory, but for unknown reasons, Hudheifa was recalled. 

The Persians then launched a counterattack, causing the Muslims to abandon their forward posts in Azarbaijan. As a response, Umar sent expeditionary forces to Azarbaijan, one led by Bukair ibn Abdullah and another by Utba bin Farqad. The contingent under Bukair confronted the Persians at Jurmizan. The Persians were commanded by Isandiar. The battle was quite severe, the Persians were defeated and their commander Isandiar was captured alive. Isandiar asked Bukair, "Do you prefer war or peace?" to which Bukair replied that the Muslims preferred peace. Isandiar thereupon said, "Then keep me with you till I can help you in negotiating peace with the people of Azarbaijan". The Persians went to nearby hill forts and shut themselves within. The Muslims captured the entire area in the plains.

During the year of 25 Hijr, the Mushaf Uthmani of Quran was created in an attempt to avoid linguistic confusion of Qur'an which had been translated to local dialect of Azerbaijan and Armenia. Hudhaifa warned Uthman that the translation would lose its original Tafseer if it failed to standardise in the original Mushaf version first, before the locals could translate and give commentary.

Aftermath

Bukair ibn Abdullah, who had recently subdued Azerbaijan, was assigned to capture Tiflis. From Bab at the western coast of the Caspian Sea, Bukair marched north. Umar decided to practice his traditional and successful strategy of multi-pronged attacks. While Bukair was still miles away from Tiflis, Umar instructed him to divide his army into three corps. Umar appointed Habib ibn Muslaima to capture Tiflis, Abdulrehman to march north towards the mountains and Hudheifa to march towards the southern mountains. Habib captured Tiflis and the region up to the eastern coast of the Black Sea. Abdulrehman marched north to the Caucasus Mountains and subdued the tribes. Hudheifa marched south-west to the mountainous region and subdued the local tribes there. The advance into Armenia came to an end with Umar's death in November 644. By then, almost all of South Caucasus had been captured.

After 645, forces under Walid Bin Uqba campaigned in four-year rotations in two frontier districts (Thughur) of Rayy and Azerbaijan. One quarter of their army consisting of 40,000 men from Kufa campaigned each year with around 4000 in Ray and 6000 in Azerbaijan.

Notes

7th-century conflicts
640s in the Rashidun Caliphate
Military history of the Rashidun Caliphate
Azerbaijan
Medieval Iranian Azerbaijan